Robert Charles Gleason Jr. (April 10, 1970 – January 16, 2013) was an American serial killer who was sentenced to death and executed in Virginia for two separate murders of two of his cellmates. Gleason, who was already serving a life sentence for another murder, was an execution volunteer who vowed to continue killing in prison if he was not put to death. Capital punishment was abolished in Virginia on March 24, 2021, officially making Gleason the last person to be executed in Virginia by electrocution.

Crimes and sentencing
In 2008, Gleason was sentenced to life in prison for the 2007 murder of Michael Kent Jamerson (March 13, 1953 – May 8, 2007) in Amherst County, Virginia. Gleason murdered Jamerson to cover up his involvement in a drug gang. In 2009, while serving a life sentence at Wallens Ridge State Prison, Gleason had become frustrated with the Department of Corrections because they refused to move out his new, severely mentally ill cellmate, Harvey Gray Watson (September 11, 1945 – May 8, 2009). Watson had been serving a 100-year sentence for a shooting spree on August 11, 1983, which resulted in one death and three injuries. Gleason hog-tied, beat and strangled 63-year-old Watson, on the second anniversary of Jamerson's death. Gleason pleaded guilty. In court and media interviews, Gleason vowed to continue killing if not given a death sentence.

Gleason also claimed to have killed other people before his incarceration for Jamerson's murder. He said he was paid to kill some of the alleged victims, while he killed others for angering him.

While awaiting sentencing at Red Onion State Prison, a highly secure prison for the state's most dangerous inmates, Gleason strangled 26-year-old Aaron Cooper (September 27, 1983 – July 28, 2010) through wire fencing that separated their individual cages in a prison yard on July 28, 2010. Cooper had been serving a 34-year sentence for robbery. Gleason was subsequently sentenced to death, voluntarily waived his appeals, and received his request. He chose the electric chair over lethal injection.

Execution
Gleason was executed by electric chair at Greensville Correctional Center in Jarratt, Virginia, on January 16, 2013, at 9:08p.m. He was the first person executed in the United States in 2013. He had a last meal that he wanted kept secret. His last words were purportedly, "Well, I hope Percy ain't going to forget to wet the sponge. Put me on the highway to Jackson and call my Irish buddies. Póg mo thóin. God bless." The phrase "Póg mo thóin," is translated from Irish as "Kiss my arse." His execution was the first to be carried out by electric chair since the March 2010 execution of Paul Warner Powell, also in Virginia. Gleason stands as the most recent person to die in the Virginia electric chair, the last person to die in the electric chair in any jurisdiction for almost six years until the November 2018 execution of Edmund Zagorski in Tennessee and the most recent person executed by electrocution in a jurisdiction other than the state of Tennessee.

Capital punishment debate
In 2021, Gleason's case was referred to when a bill was brought forth to end capital punishment in Virginia. Supporters of capital punishment referenced Gleason's case as an example of why Virginia should continue the practice, pointing out that Gleason had continued to kill while he was behind bars, and would have continued to do so had he not been executed. Advocates of capital punishment argued that executing Gleason had saved lives and that death was the appropriate sentence for people like Gleason.

On March 24, 2021, capital punishment was abolished in Virginia, officially making Gleason the last person to be executed in Virginia by electrocution.

See also
 List of people executed in Virginia
 List of people executed in the United States in 2013
 List of serial killers in the United States
 List of white defendants executed for killing a black victim
 Race and capital punishment in the United States

References

1970 births
2013 deaths
21st-century American criminals
21st-century executions by Virginia
Executed American serial killers
Male serial killers
People convicted of murder by Virginia
People executed by Virginia by electric chair
People from Lowell, Massachusetts
Prisoners sentenced to life imprisonment by Virginia
Volunteer execution